Rhiannon Braund is a New Zealand academic and registered pharmacist. She is a professor in the Department of Preventive and Social Medicine at the University of Otago.

Academic career 
Braund completed a BSc, BPharm and PhD (2008) at the University of Otago and is a registered pharmacist. In December 2019 she was promoted to full professor at Otago, with effect from 1 February 2020.

In 2018 Braund was elected Fellow of the Pharmaceutical Society of New Zealand and became president of the Society in December 2020.

Selected works

Books

Journal articles

References

External links 

 
 

Living people
Year of birth missing (living people)
New Zealand pharmacists
New Zealand women academics
University of Otago alumni
Academic staff of the University of Otago